The Chinese water snake, Chinese smooth water snake, Chinese mud snake or Chinese rice paddy snake (Enhydris chinensis or Myrrophis chinensis) is a species of mildly venomous, rear-fanged snake, endemic to Asia.

Geographic range
Enhydris chinensis is found in China, Taiwan, and Vietnam.

Habitat
As the common name suggests, the Chinese water snake is a highly aquatic species, adapting well to human-altered environments such as fish pools and rice paddies.

Conservation status
Enhydris chinensis is considered common, although it has declined in Taiwan and is protected there.

Description

Diet
The Chinese water snake typically feeds on fish and amphibians.

Commercial use
Enhydris chinensis are harvested for food and skins, but this is not considered to be threatening its populations.

Medicinal use
Enhydris chinensis is used in folk medicine. It is commonly used in the production of Chinese snake oil. It is known for treating ailments such as fever, joint pain, and headache.

References

Further reading
 Boulenger, G. A. (1896). Catalogue of the Snakes in the British Museum (Natural History). Volume III., Containing the Colubridæ (Opisthoglyphæ and Proteroglyphæ), ... London: Trustees of the British Museum (Natural History). (Taylor and Francis, printers). xiv + 727 pp. + Plates I-XXV. (Hypsirhina chinensis, pp. 8–9 + Plate I, Figures 2 & 2a).
Brands, S. J. (comp.) (1989-2006). Systema Naturae 2000. The Taxonomicon. Amsterdam, The Netherlands: Universal Taxonomic Services.
 Gray, J. E. (1842). Monographic Synopsis of the Water Snakes, or the Family HYDRIDÆ. Zoological Miscellany 1842: 59–68. (Hypsirhina chinensis, new species, p. 66).
 Günther, A. C. L. G. (1864). The Reptiles of British India. London: The Ray Society. (Taylor and Francis, printers). xxvii + 452 pp. + Plates I-XXVI. (Hypsirhina chinensis, p. 283).
Kumar, A. B.; Sanders, K. L.; George, S.; Murphy, J. C. (2012). The status of Eurostus dussumieri and Hypsirhina chinensis (Reptilia, Squamata, Serpentes): with comments on the origin of salt tolerance in homalopsid snakes. Systematics and Biodiversity 10 (4): 479–489. (Myrrophis chinensis, new combination).
 Smith, M. A. (1943). The Fauna of British India, Ceylon and Burma, Including the Whole of the Indo-Chinese Sub-region. Reptilia and Amphibia. Vol. III.—Serpentes. London: Secretary of State for India. (Taylor and Francis, printers). xii + 583 pp. (Enhydris chinensis, p. 387).

Enhydris
Reptiles of China
Reptiles of Taiwan
Reptiles of Vietnam
Reptiles described in 1842
Taxa named by John Edward Gray
Snakes of Asia
Snakes of China
Snakes of Vietnam
Taxobox binomials not recognized by IUCN